The Le Français pistol by Manufrance was produced from 1913 till 1969, in a variety of calibres.  It was mainly sold in France, primarily to the greater public but also to some officers of the French Army (during the Phony War), and to the French municipal police.  In 1912, Etienne Mimard the Head of Manufrance (La Manufacture Française d'Armes et de Cycles de Saint Etienne) started development.  Mr. Mimard obtained the patent for the first model (Modèle E) on August 6, 1913, with n° 472.505. Sales started in 1914 with the name "Le Français".

Description
It is loaded through a tip up barrel and after the first shot loads from the magazine. However, the first shot can only be loaded into the barrel since there is no way to manually pull back the slide. The trigger is double action only. The pistol was the first to function solely in double action.

 Manufrance "Le Français" modèle E (France – Pistol DAO in 1913 – 6.35 mm/.25 ACP)
 Manufrance "Le Français" Franco (France – Pistol DAO – 6.35 mm/.25 ACP)
 Manufrance "Le Français" manumodèle (France – Pistol DAO – 6.35 mm/.25 ACP)
 Manufrance "Le Français" Type Policeman (France – Pistol DAO – 6.35 mm/.25 ACP)
 Manufrance "Le Français" Type francais-Champion (France – Pistol Selective mode DAO /SA – .25 ACP or .22LR)
 Manufrance "Le Français" Type ARMEE (France – Pistol DAO – 9 mm Browning Long)
 Manufrance "Le Français" Type Français civil (France – Pistol DAO – 7.65 mm/.32 ACP)
 Manufrance "Le Français" Type Français 50 (France – Pistol DAO – 7.65 mm/.32 ACP)
 Manufrance "Le Français" Type Français 7,65 (France – Pistol DAO – 7.65 mm/.32 ACP)

References

 Henrotin, Gerard – French LE FRANCAIS pistols explained – HLebooks.com, 2011.

External links
LE FRANCAIS pistol model Policeman (infographic tech. drawing)

Semi-automatic pistols of France
.25 ACP semi-automatic pistols
.32 ACP semi-automatic pistols
.22 LR pistols